Tuhelj is a village and municipality in  Krapina-Zagorje County in Croatia. According to the 2011 census, there are 2,104 inhabitants in the area, the majority of which are Croats. Tuhelj is famous for its spa, and mud which is rich in Chromium.

The parish church in Tuhelj is home to a Crucifixion sculpture by Antun Augustinčić.

References

Populated places in Krapina-Zagorje County
Municipalities of Croatia
Spa towns in Croatia